‘Young Lover, New Lover''' is a 2012 Short stories collection by Muhammad Aladdin, and has been published by Merit Publishing House in Egypt. It is his third short stories collection followed by the novel A Well-Trained Stray'' in 2014.

An introduction
A 23 short stories mainly about madness, alienation, and secrets.

Literary significance & criticism
The feeling author Muhammad Aladdin offers his readers in his latest collection of 23 short stories,  is that of delving into a new and experimental genre of writing. The language is simple, the flow smooth. Published by Dar Merit in early 2012, “Young Lover, New Lover“ is different from Aladdin’s previous writings in its simplicity. Yet it remains experimental simply by reintroducing some of the classical techniques of story writing with contemporary themes.

Aladdin starts off the collection with “Arabat al-Nar” (The Fire Cart). It is a snapshot of a killing scene on the street, in which the narrator mediates what happens between the killing and the victim’s name being recorded in police records. The narrator witnesses how the woman dragged down the street is slaughtered with a knife. The perpetrator immediately leaves, and he is left staring at the victim whose eyes are fixated on him. The narrative is simple. Its strength stems from the emotional intensity of the moments before the woman passes away and the language Aladdin uses to describe them.

The author belongs to a group of young vanguard writers who started a new wave of literary experimentation in 2005. Their writings carried their hopes for change; much of it was extremely out voiced and tended to break social and cultural taboos. Aladdin’s 2006 masterpiece, The Gospel According to Adam,” strongly reflects this trend as it tells of a man’s sexual fantasies about an attractive young woman he sees on Tahrir Square in downtown Cairo. In his 2008 collection, The Secret Life of Citizen M,” he also broke away from the classic structure of the novel, creating more of a psychological experience for readers by starting with conflict and ending by theorising on a number of propositions. “The Fire Cart,” on the other hand, has an introduction, climax and ending.

“Young Lover, New Lover” short story collection came after three years of work — Aladdin had not published anything since his novel The Idol in 2009. The development in his style and the influence of literary classics are highly evident in the newly released collection. Among the influences apparent in the collection is that of Sufi literature. In the short story “Malh al-Ard” (Salt of the Earth), Aladdin tells a story of a man who experiences a revelation and tries to reach a higher spiritual state. The very language he uses is inspired by Sufism. Throughout the collection, readers find poetic phrases. He repeats certain phrases to create a rhythm, and reflect how his protagonists are somehow lost, going around in circles.

The protagonist of “Bayt Gameel Saeed” (A Beautiful Happy Home) is a woman who collects antiques to furnish her flat when she gets married. As she turns 30, she accepts to marry a younger man, but their new home is too small for her antique collection. She knew the marriage would not last, but could not stop buying antiques although her only son hates them. Her very special collection becomes a hindrance to whatever she wants to do.

“Michael” is perhaps the only story in the collection that reflects some of the provocation of Aladdin’s earlier works. It tells the story of an angel who feels neglected by God.

Overall the collection is an interesting read, although some short stories come off like snippets, snapshots of particular incidents. Still, they somehow link back to the main stories in “The Small and the Current,” tying it closely back together.

it was chosen as one of the most important books of the year by Al Saqia Al Thaqafia The Cultural Wheel, a notable arts and literature centre in Egypt, it was the only short story collection chosen.
Along with the American translation of the main title story, a Russian translation for one of the stories within it, The Voice (short story), was published by the Russian newspaper Moskovskij Komsomolets in their Egypt edition, translated by Sarali Gintsburg. In March 2014, the same story was translated to Italian by Barbra Benini and published in Editoriaraba, a notable Italian blog dedicated to Arabic Literature, in 24 hours it was reblogged  on the blog MedShake on the ISPI website, an Italian prestigious research institute on international politics.

External links
‘’The Story about new writing”-an essay on the book on Egypt Independent

References

Egyptian fiction
2012 short story collections